Citrobacter europaeus  is a bacterium from the genus of Citrobacter which has been isolated from human feces in Réunion in France.

References

External links
Type strain of Citrobacter europaeus at BacDive -  the Bacterial Diversity Metadatabase

 

Bacteria described in 2017
europaeus